Ben Pearce is an English DJ and music producer. He has co-founded the record label and DJ agency Purp & Soul with Chris Farnworth and heads as the Creative Director. Ben Pearce's music is considered Deep House with punk/metal, hip-hop, electronica, soul and funk influences.

Music career
On 11 October 2012. Pearce released his first EP titled What I Might Do on MTA Records and Under The Shade. He released his debut single "What I Might Do" on 20 August 2013. "What I Might Do" samples vocals from R&B artist Anthony Hamilton's 2003 song, "Cornbread, Fish & Collard Greens".
After four years of releasing the song, in February 2016, he released his EP entitled Pomelo.

Discography

Extended plays
Pomelo (2016)

Singles

Other appearances

Remixes

References

External links
Purp & Soul Official website

Living people
DJs from Manchester
Remixers
British record producers
Year of birth missing (living people)